Science Journal could refer to:
Scientific journals in general
Science (journal), also known as Science Magazine, published by the American Association for the Advancement of Science
New Scientist, which absorbed a magazine called Science Journal in 1971 and was then briefly known as New Scientist and Science Journal